Saritha Komatireddy  is an American lawyer and Deputy Chief of General Crimes in the United States Attorney's Office for the Eastern District of New York who is a former nominee to be a United States district judge of the United States District Court for the Eastern District of New York.

Education 

Komatireddy earned her Bachelor of Arts, cum laude, from Harvard University, and her Juris Doctor, magna cum laude, from Harvard Law School, where she also served on the Harvard Law Review.

She graduated from Hickman High School in Columbia, Missouri, where she was a Presidential scholar

Legal and academic career 

Upon graduating law school, Komatireddy served as a law clerk to then-Judge Brett Kavanaugh of the United States Court of Appeals for the District of Columbia Circuit. She served as counsel to the National Commission on the BP Deepwater Horizon Oil Spill and Offshore Drilling. She also worked for the United States Attorney's Office for the Eastern District New York as the Computer Hacking and Intellectual Property Coordinator and later as Deputy Chief of General Crimes. She was in private practice at Kellogg, Hansen, Todd, Figel & Frederick, PLLC. She is currently a lecturer in law at Columbia Law School and previously taught at George Washington University Law School.

Expired nomination to district court 

On February 12, 2020, President Trump announced his intent to nominate Komatireddy to serve as a United States district judge for the United States District Court for the Eastern District of New York. On May 4, 2020, her nomination was sent to the Senate. President Trump nominated Komatireddy to the seat vacated by Judge Joseph F. Bianco, who was elevated to the United States Court of Appeals for the Second Circuit on May 17, 2019. On January 3, 2021, her nomination was returned to the President under Rule XXXI, Paragraph 6 of the United States Senate.

References

Living people
Year of birth missing (living people)
Place of birth missing (living people)
21st-century American lawyers
Columbia Law School faculty
George Washington University Law School faculty
Hickman High School alumni
Harvard Law School alumni
Lawyers from Washington, D.C.
21st-century American women lawyers
People from Columbia, Missouri
Harvard College alumni